Batur Altıparmak (born 1 January 1971) is a Turkish former footballer who played as a defender. After his playing career, Batur became a footballing agent, and managed famous Turkish players like Caner Erkin, Mehmet Topal, Selçuk İnan, and Enes Ünal, amongst others.

International career
A youth international for Turkey, Batur represented Turkey at the 1987 UEFA European Under-16 Championship.

Personal life
Batur is the son of the Turkish international footballer Ogün Altıparmak.

References

External links
 
 TFF Agent Profile
 

1971 births
Living people
Footballers from Istanbul
Turkish footballers
Turkey youth international footballers
Association football defenders
Zeytinburnuspor footballers
Gaziantepspor footballers
Fenerbahçe S.K. footballers
MKE Ankaragücü footballers
Turanspor footballers
Süper Lig players
TFF Second League players
Association football agents